The Hijrah or Hijra was the journey of the Islamic prophet Muhammad and his followers from Mecca to Medina. The year in which the Hijrah took place is also identified as the epoch of the Lunar Hijri and Solar Hijri calendars; its date equates to 16 July 622 in the Julian calendar. The Arabic word hijra means "departure" or "migration", among other definitions. It has been also transliterated as Hegira in medieval Latin, a term still in occasional use in English.

Early in Muhammad's preaching of Islam, his followers only included his close friends and relatives. Following the spread of his religion, Muhammad and his small faction of Muslims faced several challenges including a boycott of Muhammad's clan, torture, killing, and other forms of religious persecution by the Meccans. Toward the end of the decade, Abu Talib, Muhammad's uncle, who supported him amidst the leaders of Mecca, died. Finally, the leaders of Mecca ordered the assassination of Muhammad, which was to be executed by 11 men with swords.

In May 622, after having convened twice with members of the Medinan tribes of Aws and Khazraj at al-'Aqabah near Mina, Muhammad secretly left his home in Mecca to emigrate to the city, along with his friend, father-in-law and companion Abu Bakr. Prophet Muhammad's arrival at Medina was warmly welcomed, resulting in the renaming of the city from Yathrib to Al Madinah Al Munawwarah (Arabic: المدينة المنورة‎, romanized: al-Madīnah al-Munawwarah, lit. 'The Enlightened City', Hejazi pronunciation: [almadiːna almʊnawːara]), commonly simplified as Madīnah or Madinah (Arabic: المدينة‎, romanized: al-Madina, Hejazi pronunciation: [almadiːna]).

Etymology 
Hijrah is a modern transliteration of the Arabic noun  meaning departure, derived from the verb  meaning "emigrate". The first recorded use of the word, in the form of the medieval Latin transliteration of 'Hegira', came in the late 15th-century, while the first usage of the word to refer to an exodus was in 1753.

Background 
Medina was inhabited by both Arabs and Jews. The Arabs consisted of two tribes–the Banu Aws and Banu Khazraj. The Aws and Khazraj were constantly at war with each other, and this made traditional rules for maintaining law and order dysfunctional, and, without a neutral man with considerable authority over things, stability seemed unlikely. It is also accepted by modern historians of Arabia that the Arabs of Medina had heard from their Jewish fellow citizens of the coming of a prophet. 

During Dhu al-Hijjah of the year 620 CE, Muhammad convened with some members of the Banu Khazraj tribe from Medina near the al-'Aqabah Hill in Mina just outside of Mecca, propounded to them the doctrines of Islam, and recited portions of the Quran. Impressed by this, they embraced Islam, and during the pilgrimage of 621, five of them brought seven others with them. These twelve informed Muhammad of the beginning of gradual development of Islam in Medina, and took a formal pledge of allegiance at Muhammad's hand, promising to accept him as a prophet, to worship none but one God, and to renounce sins including theft, adultery, and murder, in what is now known as the First Pledge of al-'Aqabah. At their request, Muhammad sent with them Mus‘ab ibn 'Umair to teach them the instructions of Islam. The following year, in 622, a delegation of around 75 Muslims consisting of members of both the Aws and Khazraj from Medina restated the terms of the First Pledge and also assured Muhammad of their full support and protection if the latter would migrate to Medina as an arbitrator to reconcile among the Aws and Khazraj. This is known as the Second Pledge at al-Aqabah, and was a religiopolitical success that paved the way for the Medinan Hegira. Following the pledges, Muhammad encouraged his followers to migrate to Medina, and in a span of two months, nearly all the Muslims of Mecca migrated to the city.

Migration
Muslims believe Muhammad waited until he received divine direction to depart from Mecca. In anticipation of receiving this direction, Muhammad began making preparations and informed Abu Bakr. On the night of his departure, Muhammad's house was besieged by men of the Quraysh, who had seen large numbers of the Muslims leave the city and had planned to kill him as soon as he left. Muhammad, who was renowned for his trustworthiness, owned various properties of members the Quraysh entrusted to him and he asked Ali to stay behind to return them and to fulfill his obligations on his behalf. Muhammad asked Ali to wear his cloak and to lie down on his bed assuring him of God's protection. Ali had worn Muhammad's cloak, leading the assassins to think Muhammad had not yet departed. Ali risked his life by staying in Mecca but ultimately survived the plot. He would later leave for Medina with his mother, Fatima bint Asad, Muhammed's daughters Fatimah and Umm Kulthum, as well as two other women, Muhammad's wife Sawda and wetnurse Umm Ayman. 

Muhammad and Abu Bakr left the city and took shelter in a cave atop the Thawr mountain south of Mecca before continuing their journey to elude the Quraysh party pursuing them led by Suraqa bin Malik. They stayed in the cave for three days before resuming their journey. During the journey, whenever Suraqa neared Muhammad and Abu Bakr, Suraqa's horse stumbled until he finally gave up on the desire of capturing Muhammad. Muhammad and Abu Bakr turned to the Red Sea, following the coastline up to Medina, arriving at Quba'. He stopped at Quba' and established a mosque there. He waited there for fourteen days for Ali and his family to join him. Thereafter he continued to Medina, participated in their first Friday prayer on the way. Upon reaching the city, they were greeted cordially by its people.

Aftermath and legacy 
Muhammad's followers suffered from poverty after fleeing persecution in Mecca and migrating with Muhammad to Medina. Their Meccan persecutors seized their wealth and belongings left behind in Mecca. Beginning in January 623, Muhammad led several raids against Meccan caravans travelling along the eastern coast of the Red Sea. Members of different tribes were thus unified by the urgency of the moment. This unity was primarily based on the bonds of kinship.

The second Rashidun Caliph, Omar, designated the Muslim year during which the Hegira occurred the first year of the Islamic calendar in 638 or the 17th year of the Hegira. This was later Latinized to Anno hegirae, the abbreviation of which is still used to denote Hijri dates today. Burnaby states that: "Historians in general assert that Muhammad fled from Mecca at the commencement of the third month of the Arabian year, Rabi 'u-l-awwal. They do not agree as to the precise day. According to Ibn-Ishak, it was on the first or second day of the month;"

Several Islamic historians and scholars, including Al Biruni, Ibn Sa'd, and Ibn Hisham, have discussed these dates in depth. The hypothetical dates of the major milestones of the Hegira are calculated by retrocalculating the dates in the current Islamic calendar. When the tabular Islamic calendar was invented by Muslim astronomers, it changed all the known dates by about 118 days or four lunar months. The Muslim dates of the Hijrah are those recorded in an original lunisolar pre-Islamic Arabian calendar that was never converted into the purely lunar calendar to account for the four intercalary months inserted during the next nine years until intercalary months (nasī') were prohibited during the year of the Farewell Pilgrimage (10 AH).

See also 
 Laylat al-Mabit (Muhammad's escape from Mecca) 
 Battle of Badr
 List of Islamic terms in Arabic
 Hajj
 Prophetic biography
 List of expeditions of Muhammad

Notes

References

External links 

Incident of the cave
 IslamiCity.com article on the Hijrah
 Articles, audios on the Hijrah

 
Shia days of remembrance
622
Muhammad in Medina
Islamic terminology